The 2004 E3 Prijs Vlaanderen was the 47th edition of the E3 Harelbeke cycle race and was held on 27 March 2004. The race started and finished in Harelbeke. The race was won by Tom Boonen of the Quick-Step team.

General classification

References

2004 in Belgian sport
2004